The 1941–42 Irish Cup was the 62nd edition of the premier knock-out cup competition in Northern Irish football. 

Linfield won the tournament for the 21st time, defeating Glentoran 3–1 in the final at Celtic Park.

Results

First round

|}

Quarter-finals

|}

Semi-finals

|}

Final

References

External links
 Northern Ireland Cup Finals. Rec.Sport.Soccer Statistics Foundation (RSSSF)

Irish Cup seasons
1941–42 domestic association football cups
1941–42 in Northern Ireland association football